The king of clubs is a playing card in the standard 52-card deck.

King of Clubs may also refer to:

 King of Clubs (Whig club), a Whig conversation club, founded in 1798
 King of Clubs (album), the debut solo album by Paul Gilbert
 King of Clubs (video game), a video game for the Nintendo Wii, DS, PSP, and PC
 King of Clubs (TV series), an adult reality series that aired on Playboy TV
 "The King of Clubs", a short story by Agatha Christie included in Poirot's Early Cases

See also

 or 

 King of Diamonds (disambiguation)
 King of Hearts (disambiguation)
 King of Spades (disambiguation)
 Jack of Clubs (disambiguation)
 Queen of Clubs (disambiguation)
 Ace of Clubs (disambiguation)